Devonport is a harbourside suburb of Auckland, New Zealand. It is located on the North Shore, at the southern end of a peninsula that runs southeast from near Lake Pupuke in Takapuna, forming the northern side of the Waitematā Harbour. East of Devonport lies North Head, the northern promontory guarding the mouth of the harbour.

The suburb hosts the Devonport Naval Base of the Royal New Zealand Navy, the main facility for the country's naval vessels, but is best known for its harbourside dining and drinking establishments and its heritage charm. Devonport has been compared to Sausalito, California, US due to its setting and scenery.

Character 
The Devonport shops contain a variety of antique, gift and bookshops, and a number of cafes and restaurants, making it a popular destination for tourists and Aucklanders.

Day trips combining a meal in Devonport with a trip up Mount Victoria or an exploration of the military emplacements on nearby North Head are popular. Of note is the Devonport Museum, located near Mount Cambria. In April 2017 the museum was given a complete makeover by local volunteers and a TV production company.

The navy base at Devonport features strongly in the local character, with the North Shore City Council having signed a Memorandum of Understanding with the Navy which recognises the developing partnership between them. The Torpedo Bay Navy Museum is also located in Devonport.

Demographics

Devonport had a population of 3,348 at the 2018 New Zealand census, a decrease of 66 people (−1.9%) since the 2013 census, and a decrease of 69 people (−2.0%) since the 2006 census. There were 1,275 households, comprising 1,590 males and 1,758 females, giving a sex ratio of 0.9 males per female. The median age was 45.5 years (compared with 37.4 years nationally), with 615 people (18.4%) aged under 15 years, 534 (15.9%) aged 15 to 29, 1,575 (47.0%) aged 30 to 64, and 627 (18.7%) aged 65 or older.

Ethnicities were 92.2% European/Pākehā, 5.2% Māori, 2.2% Pacific peoples, 4.1% Asian, and 3.0% other ethnicities. People may identify with more than one ethnicity.

The percentage of people born overseas was 35.7, compared with 27.1% nationally.

Although some people chose not to answer the census's question about religious affiliation, 58.7% had no religion, 32.2% were Christian, 0.1% had Māori religious beliefs, 0.4% were Hindu, 0.3% were Muslim, 0.6% were Buddhist and 2.6% had other religions.

Of those at least 15 years old, 1,251 (45.8%) people had a bachelor's or higher degree, and 189 (6.9%) people had no formal qualifications. The median income was $45,800, compared with $31,800 nationally. 939 people (34.4%) earned over $70,000 compared to 17.2% nationally. The employment status of those at least 15 was that 1,320 (48.3%) people were employed full-time, 513 (18.8%) were part-time, and 54 (2.0%) were unemployed.

History 

Around 40,000 years ago Devonport consisted of three islands of volcanic origin, Mount Victoria, North Head and between them Mount Cambria (now largely quarried away).

The earliest evidence for Māori settlement dates from the mid-14th century (roughly the same time as the believed landing of the Tainui migration canoe, which is commemorated by a stone memorial on the foreshore). A significant Māori settlement on North Head was ended by attacks from rival tribes in the 1790s. About 50 Māori were still living in Torpedo Bay, with their meeting house just east of Cambridge Terrace, until they fled to the Waikato when the colonial government launched war on Waikato Māori in 1863.

Jules Dumont d'Urville, a French explorer, is thought to have gone ashore in the area in 1827, possibly as the first European. The first European building on the foreshore was a gunpowder magazine built in 1840.

Devonport is one of the oldest colonial settlements in Auckland, and the first on the North Shore. The Royal Navy  survivors of HMS Buffalo settled at Devonport. In 1841 a signal station for Auckland's shipping was erected on Mount Victoria (Takarunga), and the signal master, Robert Snow, and his family became the first Europeans to live in the area permanently. From then until the 1860s, the settlement was called Flagstaff, because of the flagstaff at the signal station. Flagstaff was subdivided for town sections and farms in the early 1850s.

For the first half century or so of its existence Devonport was geographically isolated from the rest of the North Shore, and was sometimes called "the island" by the local inhabitants. Only a thin strip of land beside the beach at Narrow Neck connected Devonport to Belmont and the rest of the North Shore peninsula. In the late 19th century the mangrove swamp that stretched from Narrow Neck to Ngataringa Bay was filled in to form a racecourse, now a golf course. A new road was built along the western edge of the racecourse allowing more direct travel to the north.

On the southern shore, to the west of the centre of Devonport, a nearby deep water anchorage suitable for Royal Navy vessels, the Devonport Naval Base was established. William Hobson, then the Governor of New Zealand, considered the sandspit-protected area a better choice for a naval installation than the shallower Tamaki waters on the southern side of the harbour. While some facilities have expanded and shifted in location over time, the area is still the primary base for the Royal New Zealand Navy. The Calliope Dock at Stanley Bay, part of the base, was opened on 16 February 1888 and at the time was the largest dock in the Southern hemisphere. The suburb also had one of the oldest New Zealand shipyards, now part of the Devonport Yacht Club area.

The main centre of the suburb slowly shifted west from Church Street and the original wharf at Torpedo Bay, to its current location around the ferry wharf. The settlement itself was renamed Devonport by 1859 after the English naval town of Devonport. Devonport achieved Borough status in 1886 and was incorporated into North Shore City in 1989.

Devonport played a special role in the nuclear free movement. In 1981 the Devonport Borough Council voted to declare Devonport a nuclear-free zone, the first local council in New Zealand to do so.

In July 2007, Devonport was given permission to be excluded from a list of local Auckland growth node centres. The Auckland Regional Council accepted that while it was encouraging intensified growth (such as higher-density housing) around transport nodes such as Devonport, the character and historical nature of the Devonport Wharf area would make such a designation inappropriate in this case.

In 2011 the Devonport community, led by parents and local publication the Devonport Flagstaff, launched a grassroots movement protesting the sale of the synthetic cannabis Kronic in local dairies. The battle was a success, and Kronic was banned from the area.

Ferries 

The first ferry services to Auckland city began in the 1840s. These were open sailing cutters operated by local seamen running passengers to the foot of Queen Street, Auckland's main road. In 1860 the first paddlesteamer ferries began operation. These were in turn replaced by double-ended, screw-driven ferries in 1904. Both passenger and vehicle ferries operated on the Devonport run until the opening of the Auckland Harbour Bridge in 1959. Immediately after the opening of the bridge, passenger ferry services to other North Shore destinations (such as Northcote and Birkenhead) were cancelled, as were all vehicular ferries. The Devonport passenger ferry was retained on a much reduced timetable. The majority of the ferries were scrapped, only a handful being retained until being replaced by more modern vessels. The last of the old-style double-ended ferries, the diesel-engined Kestrel (built in 1905), was retired from the commuter run in 1988 and was then operated for cruises and sightseeing.

In 2002 the Kestrel was moved to Tauranga to serve as a floating restaurant. The Kestrel changed hands again in 2010 and moved back to Auckland. On 8 March 2016 the Kestrel broke up and sank while tethered in its Wynyard Quarter berth. She was refloated, but her future remains uncertain.

Local government 

From 1876 until 1886, Devonport was a part of the Takapuna Riding administered by the Waitemata County, a large rural county north and west of the city of Auckland. In 1886, the area split from the council, forming the Devonport Borough Council. In 1989, the borough was merged into the North Shore City, and in 2010 incorporated into the single unitary council, run by Auckland Council.

Within the Auckland Council, Devonport is a part of the Devonport-Takapuna local government area governed by the Devonport-Takapuna Local Board. It is a part of the North Shore ward, which elects two councillors to the Auckland Council.

Mayors during Devonport Borough Council 
During its existence from 1886 to 1989, Devonport Borough had 19 mayors. The following is a complete list:

Features

Between the wharf and Mount Victoria are the Devonport shops and several landmarks:

 The Esplanade Hotel – this is an elegant example of an 1890s seaside hotel, reminiscent of many an English seaside resort of the period. A modern extension was added on in the 1950s which has now been replaced by an apartment complex. The Edwardian building was sold for $7 million in 2015.
 Windsor Reserve – located just to the east of the Devonport Wharf; it is an area of open lawn notable for the 1980s toilet block  and the Edwardian archway at the northern end.
 King Edward Parade Reserve – to the north of the Windsor Reserve on the other side of the road is the King Edward Parade Reserve; here are located the Public Library, the War Memorial (a bronze soldier figure by Richard Gross) and under the Moreton Bay Fig trees a 1950s styled bandstand.
 The former Post Office – an Art Deco building from the 1930s.
 The Left Bank – a 1920s neoclassical building now housing a cafe/bar/restaurant.
 The Victoria Cinema – built in 1912 and remodelled internally and externally in the 1930s in the then fashionable Art Deco style; this is apparently the oldest cinema in the Southern Hemisphere in continuous use. The cinema was purchased for $1.55 million in 2006 by the North Shore City Council on behalf of the city.

Devonport Museum, a museum on local history, opened in 1977. Torpedo Bay Navy Museum, a military and maritime museum, opened to the public in 2010.

Devonport Wharf
Today, ferry services to Devonport Wharf are more numerous again, and are subsidised by Auckland Transport, . A crossing between the Auckland CBD and Devonport takes about 12 minutes, usually on the 'Seabus Kea', a newer double-ended ferry.

The Devonport Wharf / Ferry Terminal received a variety of maintenance and repairs during 2011 in advance of the Rugby World Cup. Further structural works were carried out in 2012.

In 2015 a $24 million redevelopment project to upgrade parts of Devonport including the wharf began. The renovation of the Devonport wharf is all but complete, with applications for retail services currently underway. The project includes an improved car park and an overall modernization of the building itself, as well as structural improvements and refurbishments.

Local media

The Flea 88.2 FM &107.1FM is a community radio station in Auckland, New Zealand. It broadcasts with a legally restricted 1000 milliwatts from Mount Victoria, Devonport & also from Takapuna. The station is widely heard because of superior aerial location, with a studio located in the Devonport Ferry Building. The station was created by Mike Baker, in May 1999. It was originally developed to serve Devonport and the neighbouring suburbs. In recent times a second transmitter was added in the Takapuna area and the station now covers the Takapuna and Milford suburbs as well. The station founder, Mike Baker, died on 4 April 2009, at the age of 71.

Education  
Devonport Primary School is a contributing primary (years 1–6) school with a roll of  located on the side of Mount Victoria with the address of 18 Kerr Street. The school was established in 1870 on a plot of land given to them by the Trevarthen family for the purposes of a chapel, before it was later renegotiated to be used as a school.

It was founded in 1893.

Both these schools are co-educational. Rolls are as of

Sport

North Shore United AFC 
North Shore United are an association football club that play their football at Allen Hill Stadium, located near the southern end of Lake Road. The club, founded in 1887, currently play in the NRFL Division 1, a league in the third tier of New Zealand Football. The club is the oldest in both New Zealand and Oceania, winning the Chatham Cup 6 times and the New Zealand Club Championship twice.

North Shore RFC 
North Shore Rugby Football Club is a Rugby Union club located in Devonport that play their games at Devonport Domain. Founded in 1873, it is one of the oldest clubs in New Zealand.

Notable people 
Isabel Peacocke – teacher, novelist, broadcaster, born in Devonport in 1881.
Sir Dove-Myer Robinson – former Auckland Mayor born 1901, died 1989.
A. R. D. Fairburn – poet, satirist, and critic. Born 1904
Sir Peter Blake – international yachtsman, born 1948, died 2001.
Mary Taylor – artist, born 1948.
Tim Finn – musician and singer, current residence in Devonport, born 1952. 
Debbie Harwood – musician and singer, notable as a member of When The Cat's Away.
Tom Ashley – sailor, windsurfer. Gold Medal at 2008 Beijing Olympics in Men's Sail Boarding. Born 1984.
Gin Wigmore – singer-songwriter, born 1986.
Finn Andrews & Sophia Burn – members of London-based band The Veils. Both grew up in Devonport and attended Takapuna Grammar School.
Lorde – pop artist born 1996. Attended Takapuna Grammar School.
Eliza McCartney – NZ women's pole vault champion and women's pole vault World Junior Record holder. 2016 Olympics Pole Vault Bronze medal winner. Born 1996.

See also 
William C Daldy, a historical steam tug currently berthed in Devonport

References

External links 

 Devonport School
Photographs of Devonport held in Auckland Libraries' heritage collections.

Suburbs of Auckland
North Shore, New Zealand
Populated places around the Waitematā Harbour